The Compagnie Industrielle d'Applications Thermiques, or CIAT Group, is an HVAC equipment manufacturer, founded in 1934.

The headquarters and main industrial site are located in France, in Culoz department of Ain, between Lyon and Geneva. A second large industrial facility is located in Montilla, in Cordoba, Spain, where several HVAC products, such as rooftop units, are manufactured and engineered. A large research and development center including a test laboratory is also present there.

CIAT was able to expand internationally since 2004, concentrating heavily on the Middle East, as well as Canada after it was acquired by UTC in 2015. One of the most dominant reselling branches is located in the West Bank, working under the representative company GATES, registered as Green Advanced. In which they have been taking majority of the HVAC market in Palestinian territories.

History 

1934 : Foundation of CIAT by Jean Falconnier.
1984 : His son, Jean-Louis Falconnier, takes over the company.
2005 : Death of Jean-Louis Falconnier, his brother, Jean-Pierre Falconnier takes over the company.
2015 : United Technologies Corporation (UTC) acquires CIAT.

References

External links 
Corporate Website

Heating, ventilation, and air conditioning companies
Manufacturing companies of France
Manufacturing companies established in 1934
French brands
French companies established in 1934